Haas Glacier is a steep tributary glacier draining northward from Rawson Plateau to enter the south side of Bowman Glacier, in the Queen Maud Mountains of Antarctica. It was mapped by the United States Geological Survey from surveys and U.S. Navy air photos, 1960–64, and was named by the Advisory Committee on Antarctic Names for Charles G. Haas, a meteorologist in the South Pole Station winter party, 1960.

See also
 List of glaciers in the Antarctic
 Glaciology

References

Queen Maud Mountains
Glaciers of Amundsen Coast